Frederick Charles Watkins (24 February 1883 – 31 January 1954) was a Labour Party politician in England.

He was an unsuccessful candidate at the 1923 general election in Aylesbury. At the 1929 general election, he was elected as Member of Parliament (MP) for Hackney Central. He was defeated at the 1931 general election, but regained his seat in 1935 and served until he stood down at the 1945 general election.

Sources

External links 
 

1883 births
1954 deaths
Labour Party (UK) MPs for English constituencies
Members of the Fabian Society
Hackney Members of Parliament
UK MPs 1929–1931
UK MPs 1935–1945
Presidents of the Transport Salaried Staffs' Association
English trade unionists
Transport Salaried Staffs' Association-sponsored MPs